Poliodule is a genus of moths in the subfamily Arctiinae. The genus was erected by George Hampson in 1900.

Species
 Poliodule melanotricha Turner, 1941
 Poliodule poliotricha Turner, 1940
 Poliodule xanthodelta Lower, 1897

References

Lithosiini
Moth genera